Cratoxylum arborescens is a plant in the family Hypericaceae. The specific epithet  is from the Latin meaning "tree-like".

Description
The smooth to fissured bark is grey to brown. The flowers are pink to crimson.

Distribution and habitat
Cratoxylum arborescens grows naturally in Burma, Sumatra, Peninsular Malaysia and Borneo. Its habitat is mainly lowland forests, including kerangas and peat swamp forests, also up to lower montane forests, from sea-level to  altitude.

Uses
This tree produces a light hardwood timber known as Geronggang. This timber is suitable for interior work and light to medium construction.

References

arborescens
Flora of Myanmar
Flora of Sumatra
Flora of Peninsular Malaysia
Flora of Borneo
Taxonomy articles created by Polbot
Flora of the Borneo lowland rain forests
Flora of the Borneo montane rain forests
Flora of the Sundaland heath forests